"Starting All Over Again" is a song recorded by Canadian country music group One Horse Blue. It was released in 1993 as the third single from their fifth studio album, One Horse Blue. It peaked at number 7 on the RPM Country Tracks chart in October 1993.

Chart performance

Weekly charts

Year-end charts

References

1993 songs
1993 singles
One Horse Blue songs